Dillon is a city in and the county seat of Beaverhead County, Montana, United States. The population was 3,880 at the 2020 census. The city was named for Sidney Dillon (1812–1892), president of Union Pacific Railroad.

History

Dillon was founded in the Beaverhead Valley as a railroad town in 1880. Originally named “Terminus” as it was temporarily the northernmost stop on the Utah and Northern Railway while it was under construction, in 1881, the community was renamed for Union Pacific Railroad President Sidney Dillon, who had directed the project of bringing the railroad through to Butte, Montana.   The town's location was selected by the railroad in part because of its proximity to gold mines in the area.

The first ore discovered in the Dillon area was silver. Gold was first discovered at Grasshopper Creek in 1862, precipitating a flood of immigration to the area. The last real gold rush in the area occurred near Argenta in 1920 and lasted for 30 years.

Dillon served as a central location for transporting goods to nearby boomtowns such as Bannack, Argenta, Glen, and Virginia City. In 1881, Dillon became part of a contentious battle with Bannack to become the county seat of Beaverhead County. The first brick building in Dillon was built in 1882. In 1884, Dillon became an incorporated town and began building sidewalks and permanent dwellings for the residents.

While many of the gold mining towns around Dillon died, Dillon was able to thrive due to the railroad and talc mining in the area. A cattle industry was established in 1865. The agriculturally rich Beaverhead Valley became an ideal location for sheep ranching, introduced in 1869. Dillon was once the largest exporter of sheep wool in Montana.

The Montana Normal College was established as a teaching college in 1892, and is still functioning today, renowned for its Education program. A circus elephant named Old Pitt was struck by lightning in 1943 and is buried at the Dillon fairgrounds. Captain Joel Rude of the Montana National Guard crashed his F-106 into a grain elevator and died during a Labor Day Parade on September 3, 1979. A plaque in his honor is part of the Southwest Montana Veterans Memorial park in Dillon.

Geography

Dillon is situated on the Beaverhead River.

Demographics

In April 2010, Dillon was listed as one of "America's Prettiest Towns" by Forbes magazine.

2010 census
As of the 2010 census, there were 4,134 people, 1,774 households, and 897 families living in the city. The racial makeup of the city was 94.7% White, 0.3% African American, 1.4% Native American, 0.5% Asian, 0.6% Pacific Islander, 0.6% from other races, and 1.9% from two or more races. Hispanic or Latino of any race were 3.5% of the population.

There were 1,774 households, of which 23.0% had children under the age of 18 living with them, 38.2% were married couples living together, 9.1% had a female householder with no husband present, 3.3% had a male householder with no wife present, and 49.4% were non-families. 40.1% of all households were made up of individuals, and 15.9% had someone living alone who was 65 years of age or older. The average household size was 2.08 and the average family size was 2.82.

The median age in the city was 33.9 years. 20% of residents were under the age of 18; 19.4% were between the ages of 18 and 24; 20.3% were from 25 to 44; 23.7% were from 45 to 64; and 16.7% were 65 years of age or older. The gender makeup of the city was 49.4% male and 50.6% female.

2000 census
As of the 2000 census, there were 3,752 people, 1,669 households, and 934 families living in the city. The population density was 2,300.7 people per square mile (888.7/km2). There were 1,831 housing units at an average density of 1,122.7 per square mile  (433.7/km2). The racial makeup of the city was 96.43% White, 0.35% African American, 1.31% Native American, 0.13% Asian, 0.61% from other races, and 1.17% from two or more races. Hispanic or Latino of any race were 1.95% of the population.

There were 1,669 households, out of which 27.6% had children under the age of 18 living with them, 44.3% were married couples living together, 8.3% had a female householder with no husband present, and 44.0% were non-families. 36.2% of all households were made up of individuals, and 14.9% had someone living alone who was 65 years of age or older. The average household size was 2.19 and the average family size was 2.88.

In the city, the population was spread out, with 22.7% under the age of 18, 11.1% from 18 to 24, 25.5% from 25 to 44, 22.4% from 45 to 64, and 18.3% who were 65 years of age or older. The median age was 39 years. For every 100 females there were 97.5 males. For every 100 females age 18 and over, there were 94.6 males.

The median income for a household in the city was $26,389, and the median income for a family was $39,643. Males had a median income of $25,625 versus $18,906 for females. The per capita income for the city was $16,432. About 13.8% of families and 18.2% of the population were below the poverty line, including 15.9% of those under age 18 and 15.9% of those age 65 or over.

Media
KDBM AM 1490 and KBEV-FM 98.3, owned by the Dead-Air Broadcasting Company, are both licensed to serve the Dillon area. KDWG FM 90.9 is operated by the University of Montana Western.

Television stations come from Butte and Denver:
 KXLF (Channel 4) CBS affiliate
 KDVR (Channel 5) Fox Affiliate
 KTVM (Channel 6) NBC affiliate
 KUSM (Channel 9) PBS affiliate

Dillon has two primary newspapers:
 The Dillonite Daily includes sections such as new job listings in and around the area, any and all things for sale, ISO, recent activity, and upcoming events.
 The Dillon Tribune presents sports, obituaries, community news, classifieds, weather and a local calendar.

Education
Dillon is part of School District 10 under Superintendent Glen A. Johnson. Schools in this district include: Parkview Elementary School, under Principal Greg Fitzgerald, and the Dillon Middle School under Principal Randy Shipman. Dillon is also home to Beaverhead County High School, a Class A High School under Principal Gary Haverfield. As of 2017, there were around 320 students. The high school's mascot is the Beaver.

Dillon is known statewide for its decades of success in high school sports. The boys' basketball team won the Class A State Championship in 1990, the school's first state title since 1946. Since 2000 the high school football team has played in 11 Class A State Championships, winning eight. The boys' basketball team has played in eight Class A State Championships since 2007, winning five.

The city is also home to the University of Montana Western, formerly Western Montana College, under provost and vice chancellor Deborah Hedeen and Chancellor Beth Weatherby. As of 2016, there were 1,501 students. The college mascot is the Bulldog.

Dillon Public Library was built as a Carnegie library in 1901 and still serves the community.

Economy
Dillon's largest employers include Barretts Minerals Inc., Barrett Hospital and HealthCare, and Beaverhead County. Great Harvest Bread Company has its franchising headquarters in Dillon. Patagonia has an outlet in Dillon.

Dillon has 31 restaurants, including local businesses such as Papa T's Family Dining, Sparky's Garage, Stageline Pizza, the Lion's Den, 4 B's Restaurant, Sweetwater Coffee, La Fiesta Mexicana, and Mac's Last Cast. The Beaverhead Brewing Company is also in Dillon. Fast food chains with locations in Dillon include Dairy Queen, McDonald's, Subway, Pita Pit, Taco John's, and Pizza Hut. Chain stores in Dillon are Safeway, Town & Country, Ace Hardware, and Murdoch's Ranch & Home Supply.

The Beaverhead County Museum is in Dillon. Public facilities in Dillon include the Dillon Public Library, Post Office, and Barrett's Park. The YMCA has a location within the city limits.

Recreational activities that draw tourism to Dillon include fishing on the Beaverhead River, snowmobiling, hiking, shopping at the Patagonia outlet, four-wheeling, the annual Demolition Derby, and skiing at Maverick Mountain Ski Area. Bannack State Park is popular with tourists. Dillon is also home to the annual "Montana's Biggest Weekend" event, also known as the Jaycee Labor Day Rodeo, Concert, & Parade.

Infrastructure
Dillon Airport is a county-owned airport five miles northeast of Dillon.

Climate
Dillon experiences a semi-arid climate (Köppen BSk) with cold, dry winters and hot, wetter summers.

Notable people
 Troy Andersen, NFL linebacker
 Ed Barker, NFL wide receiver
 Lloyd Meeds, politician, lobbyist, and navy officer
 Edwin L. Norris, 5th Governor of Montana (1908–1913)
 Jacob Thorkelson, United States Representative from Montana
 Benjamin F. White, former mayor of Dillon and last Governor of Montana Territory (1889)

See also

 List of municipalities in Montana

References

External links

 

Cities in Beaverhead County, Montana
County seats in Montana
1880 establishments in Montana Territory
Railway towns in Montana
Cities in Montana